Houchens Industries–L. T. Smith Stadium at Jimmy Feix Field is a 22,000-seat multi-purpose stadium in Bowling Green, in the U.S. state of Kentucky. It is home to the Western Kentucky University Hilltoppers football team.

History
When the stadium was built in 1968 it seated 19,250 fans. The facility was expanded to a seating capacity of 22,000 in a project that was completed in 2008. This was planned to prepare for the Hilltoppers' move to the highest level of NCAA football competition, Division I FBS (formerly known as Division I-A), completed in 2009. However, the facility remains one of the smallest stadiums in the FBS.

Renovations
A 1989 renovation reduced the seating capacity to 17,500 seats.  Lights were installed in 1987 and an Astroplay playing surface was installed in 2002. On July 19, 2007, WKU reported that Houchens Industries, a long-time corporate supporter of WKU, made a $5 million commitment to an expansion and renovation project for the school's football stadium. In honor of the gift, WKU added Houchens Industries to the name of L. T. Smith Stadium. Today, the stadium is now titled as Houchens Industries–L. T. Smith Stadium.

Notable events
Smith Stadium has been the site of marching band competitions, high school football games, the university's graduation ceremonies and the Special Olympics. Starting in 2009, it became the site of Kentucky's high school football championship games, which had been previously held at the current Cardinal Stadium on the campus of the University of Louisville. Although the contract with the Kentucky High School Athletic Association (KHSAA) had been extended through 2018, the KHSAA decided to move the championships away from WKU in 2017. One of the reasons cited was the Hilltoppers' recent football success, specifically their hosting of the 2015 and 2016 Conference USA championship games, which forced the rescheduling of several high school championship games on short notice. Accordingly, the 2017 and 2018 KHSAA championships were moved to the University of Kentucky's Kroger Field.

Record crowds

Homecoming 2012:

Homecoming 2013:

See also
 List of NCAA Division I FBS football stadiums

References

Buildings and structures in Bowling Green, Kentucky
College football venues
Western Kentucky Hilltoppers football
American football venues in Kentucky
Multi-purpose stadiums in the United States
Tourist attractions in Bowling Green, Kentucky
Sports venues completed in 1968
1968 establishments in Kentucky